Arlington College might refer to one of several academic institutions, including:
 Arlington College, the school that eventually became the University of Texas at Arlington
 Arlington College, a Christian school in California that merged into Azusa Pacific University